SM UB-100 was a German Type UB III submarine or U-boat in the German Imperial Navy during World War I. She was commissioned into the German Imperial Navy on 17 September 1918 as SM UB-100.

 
UB-100 was surrendered on 22 November 1918 and broken up in Dortrecht in 1922.

Construction

She was built by AG Vulcan of Hamburg and following just under a year of construction, launched at Hamburg on 13 August 1918. UB-100 was commissioned later the same year . Like all Type UB III submarines, UB-100 carried 10 torpedoes and was armed with a  deck gun. UB-100 had a displacement of  while surfaced and  when submerged. Her engines enabled her to travel at  when surfaced and  when submerged.

References

Notes

Citations

Bibliography

 

German Type UB III submarines
World War I submarines of Germany
U-boats commissioned in 1918
1918 ships
Ships built in Hamburg